The 1965 BRSCC British Saloon Car Championship, was the eighth season of the championship. The title was won by Roy Pierpoint in a Ford Mustang, competing in his debut season.

Calendar & Winners
All races were held in the United Kingdom. Overall winners in bold.

Dead heat.

Championship results

References

British Touring Car Championship seasons
Saloon